The term social fund may refer to:

Social fund in developing countries which provides financing (usually grants) for small-scale public investments
 The European Social Fund 
 the UK's Social Fund, part of the system of Social Security.